Quality Corner is a hamlet in the English county of Cumbria.

Quality Corner is located about one mile east of the port of Whitehaven; its postal address being Quality Corner, Moresby, Cumbria.

External links 

Hamlets in Cumbria
Borough of Copeland